Leucadendron modestum, the rough-leaf conebush, is a flower-bearing shrub that belongs to the genus Leucadendron and forms part of the fynbos. The plant is native to the Western Cape, South Africa.

Description
Fire destroys the plant but the seeds survive. The seeds are stored in a toll on the female plant and are released after a fire and possibly spread by the wind. The plant is unisexual; there are male and female plants that reproduce by the activities of small towers.

Distribution and habitat
The plant occurs on the Elim Plain from Stanford and Bredasdorp to Cape Agulhas.

References

External links
Rough-leaf Conebush
Leucadendron modestum (Rough-leaf conebush)
Clay Conebushes - Leucadendrons

modestum